Verbny is a rural locality (a khutor) in Gmelinskoye Rural Settlement, Staropoltavsky District, Volgograd Oblast, Russia. The population was 205 as of 2010. There are 5 streets.

Geography 
Verbny is located in steppe, 49 km southeast of Staraya Poltavka (the district's administrative centre) by road. Gmelinka is the nearest rural locality.

References 

Rural localities in Staropoltavsky District